Hi-Point Firearms, also known as Strassell's Machine, Inc (distributed by MKS Supply), is an American firearms manufacturer based in Mansfield, Ohio. All of their firearms are manufactured in several different locations in Ohio.

Construction of products

Pistols

Hi-Point semi-automatic pistols are polymer framed handguns based on the blowback design. Different from other blowback design pistols such as the Walther PPK, the P-64, and the Astra 600 which use a heavy slide combined with a stiff recoil spring to hold the breech closed, these pistols use a heavier slide so they can use a softer recoil spring. When compared to breech-locking handguns of the same caliber and dimensions, the Hi-Point is rather top heavy. As with most blowback handguns, this pistol has fewer moving parts to clean and lubricate than its locked breech counterparts.

While most semi-automatic pistols can be field stripped without the use of any tools, Hi-Point pistols require a small punch or a screwdriver and a hammer to remove a pin in the receiver, in order to permit slide removal (and thus enable field-stripping).

Rather than being machined from forged steel, the slide is die cast from Zamak-3.  Zamak is a zinc alloy which is often used in low cost firearms; previous manufacturers using this technique included Lorcin Engineering Company and Raven Arms. Die casting is particularly commonplace in Ohio, which influenced the decision to implement it.

Uncommon for this construction, Hi-Point pistols are rated for +P ammunition in calibers up to .45 ACP.  Blowback designs are generally simpler in design and easier and cheaper to manufacture than locked-breech recoil-operated firearms. While the fixed barrel of a blowback gun generally will contribute to improved accuracy, blowback guns usually need to be larger and heavier than a locked-breech gun firing the same caliber.

Carbines
The Hi-Point carbine is a series of pistol-caliber carbines manufactured by Hi-Point Firearms chambered for 9×19mm Parabellum, .40 S&W, 10mm Auto, .45 ACP and .380 ACP. They are very inexpensive, constructed using polymers and alloyed metals as much as possible, resulting in a reduction of production costs and sale price. It functions via a simple direct blowback action. Hi-Point carbines use a polymer stock, stamped sheet metal receiver cover, and a receiver and bolt cast from Zamak-3. The barrel is steel and button rifled using a 1-10" right hand twist.

Use of zinc alloy
Some people are wary of Hi-Points because of the use of zinc alloy (Zamak-3) castings in much of their construction. However, the parts made from Zamak-3 in Hi-Point guns (slide) are low-stress components that do not require the strength of steel at these pistol cartridge power levels. The slide is made of a Zamak-3. The frame is made of steel reinforced high strength polymer. Higher stress and wear components in Hi-Points, like the barrel, chamber, breech and other small parts, are made of steel.

Calibers
Hi-Point manufactures firearms in the following calibers:
 .380 ACP – Model CF-380 and 380COMP
 9×19mm Parabellum – C-9 and C-9 COMP pistols and YC-9
 .40 S&W – Model JCP pistol
 .45 ACP – Model JHP pistol
 10mm – Model JXP pistol
 Hi-Point Carbines chambered in .380 ACP, 9mm Luger, .40 S&W, 10mm Auto, and .45 ACP

Safety
Hi-Point firearms have a manual thumb safety and an integral drop safety that prevents firing in the event that the firearm is dropped. Until the 2000s, all Hi-Point products except the 995 (9mm) carbine had a last-round lock open and magazine disconnect safety, preventing firing unless a magazine was in the gun. With the replacement of the original 9mm carbine with the new 995 TS model, all pistols and carbines now have these features.

Gallery

References

External links
 
 MKS Supply's website
 Instruction Sheet for C9 and CF380 Pistols 
 Instruction manual for 40 S&W and 45acp Pistols 

Firearm manufacturers of the United States
Companies based in Ohio